Bruno Lins Tenório de Barros (born 7 January 1987) is a Brazilian sprinter who specializes in the 200 metres.

Biography
Barros was born in Maceió and resides in São Bernardo. He represented Brazil at the 2008 Summer Olympics in Beijing. He competed in the 4x100 metres relay together with José Carlos Moreira, Vicente de Lima and Sandro Viana. In their qualification heat they placed fourth behind Trinidad and Tobago, Japan and the Netherlands. Their time of 39.01 was the seventh out of sixteen participating nations in the first round and they qualified for the final. There they sprinted to a time of 38.24 seconds, the fourth time after the Jamaican, Trinidad and Japanese teams. He also took part in the 200 metres individual, finishing fifth with a time of 21.15 seconds in his first round heat, which was not enough to qualify for the second round.

His personal best time is 20.47, achieved in February 2008 in São Paulo. He also has 10.22 seconds in the 100 metres, achieved in March 2008 in São Paulo.

In 2009, he was suspended by the IAAF for 2 years for a doping offence involving the drug rh-EPO.

He represented Brazil in the 1st Lusophone Games that took place in Macau, China in 2006; in the 2nd Lusophony Games in Lisbon, Portugal; and also in the 2012 Summer Olympics, again in both the 200 m and the 4 × 100 m relay.

Barros would retroactively be awarded the bronze medal for the 4 × 100 metres relay at the 2008 Summer Olympics following the demotion in 2017 of the Jamaican team for Nesta Carter's failed anti-doping test.

Personal bests
100 m: 10.16 (wind: +1.8 m/s) –  São Paulo, 21 March 2009
200 m: 20.16 (wind: +1.1 m/s) –  São Paulo, 7 August 2011

International competitions

1Did not start in the final

References

External links

1987 births
Living people
Brazilian male sprinters
Brazilian sportspeople in doping cases
Doping cases in athletics
Athletes (track and field) at the 2008 Summer Olympics
Athletes (track and field) at the 2012 Summer Olympics
Athletes (track and field) at the 2016 Summer Olympics
Athletes (track and field) at the 2011 Pan American Games
Olympic athletes of Brazil
Athletes (track and field) at the 2015 Pan American Games
World Athletics Championships athletes for Brazil
Pan American Games silver medalists for Brazil
S.L. Benfica athletes
Pan American Games medalists in athletics (track and field)
South American Games gold medalists for Brazil
South American Games silver medalists for Brazil
South American Games medalists in athletics
Competitors at the 2014 South American Games
Medalists at the 2011 Pan American Games
Medalists at the 2015 Pan American Games
Sportspeople from Alagoas
20th-century Brazilian people
21st-century Brazilian people